The Department of Defense Cyber Crime Center (DC3) is designated as a Federal Cyber Center by National Security Presidential Directive 54/Homeland Security Presidential Directive 23, as a Department of Defense (DoD) Center Of Excellence for Digital and Multimedia (D/MM) forensics by DoD Directive 5505.13E, and serves as the operational focal point for the Defense Industrial Base (DIB) Cybersecurity program. DC3 operates as a Field Operating Agency (FOA) under the Inspector General of the Department of the Air Force.

Mission 

Deliver superior digital and multimedia forensic services, cyber technical training, vulnerability sharing, technical solutions development, and cyber analysis within the following DoD mission areas: cybersecurity and critical infrastructure protection, law enforcement and counterintelligence, document and media exploitation, and counterterrorism.

Cyber Forensics Laboratory 

The Cyber Forensics Laboratory performs Digital and Multimedia (D/MM) forensic examinations, repairs damaged devices and extracts otherwise inaccessible data from them, and provides expert testimony in legal proceedings for DC3 customers. The lab's robust intrusion and malware analysis capability supports law enforcement, counterintelligence, and Defense Industrial Base activities and operations. The CFL also works with the Defense Cyber Operations Panel (which consists of Defense Criminal Investigative Organizations and Military Department Counterintelligence Organizations) to develop requirements and set standards for digital investigations as new technologies emerge and evolve. The CFL is an accredited lab under ISO 17025 by the ANSI National Accreditation Board, and its operations are subject to strict quality control and peer review. The CFL produces results which are valid and reliable, based on conditions and methods which are repeatable.

 Digital and Multimedia (D/MM) forensic examinations
 Device Repair
 Data Extraction
 Expert Testimony for DC3 Customers

Cyber Training Academy

The mission of the DoD Cyber Crime Center – Cyber Training Academy is to design, develop, and deliver the highest possible quality in cyber training to Department of Defense (DoD) personnel. In operation since 1998, the CTA has been instrumental in training Defense Criminal Investigative Organizations (DCIOs), Military Department Counterintelligence Organizations, Cyber Mission Forces (CMFs), Cyber Protection Teams (CPTs), Mission Defense Teams (MDTs), and many other entities across the greater DoD enterprise. "The CTA offers more than 30 unique courses of classroom, online, and Instructor-Led Virtual (ILV) cyber training to both individuals and organizations within the DoD charged with protecting defense information systems from unauthorized use, criminal and fraudulent activities, and foreign intelligence/counterintelligence efforts." —CTA

Technical Solutions Development 

Technical Solutions Development (TSD) tailors innovative software and system solutions engineered to the specific requirements of digital forensic examiners and cyber intrusion analysts. TSD validates digital forensic tools from commercial off-the-shelf, government off-the-shelf, and open-source domains to ensure relevancy and reproducibility as to expected use. In coordination with its cooperative partners, TSD:

 Leads the way by proactively identifying, researching and evaluating relevant new technologies, techniques and tools
 Actively participates in the development of industry standards, including Structured Threat Information eXpression (STIX) and Cyber-investigation Analysis Standard Expression (CASE)
 Shares in-house-developed tools with federal, state, and local law enforcement partners
 Maintains the Counterintelligence Tool Repository (CITR), a warehouse of classified and unclassified tools that support digital forensics and counterintelligence needs.

DIB Cybersecurity 

DoD-Defense Industrial Base Collaborative Information Sharing Environment (DCISE)—DCISE is the operational hub of the Defense Industrial Base (DIB) Cybersecurity Program of the Department of Defense, focused on protecting intellectual property and safeguarding DoD content residing on, or transiting through, contractor unclassified networks. The public-private cybersecurity partnership provides a collaborative environment for crowd-sourced threat sharing at both unclassified and classified levels. DCISE provides cyber resilience analyses for Cleared Defense Contractor (CDC) companies and offers unmatched Cybersecurity-as-a-Service capabilities. DCISE performs cyber threat analysis and diagnostics, offers mitigation and remediation strategies, provides best practices, and conducts analyst-to-analyst exchanges with DIB participants ranging in size from small to enterprise-sized companies.

Operations Enablement 

Operations Enablement Directorate (OED) The mission and principal focus of the OED is to amplify the effects of DoD-wide law enforcement and counterintelligence (LE/CI) investigations and operations, and by extension, the effects of the U.S. Intelligence Community at large. That charge encompasses:

 Conducting expert technical and all-source analysis (resulting in more than 493 products released in FY21) focused on countering foreign intelligence threats to DoD and the U.S. government as a whole
 Integrating disparate and emerging technologies to enhance collaboration, interoperability, and the collective capabilities of DoD and Federal LE/CI, cybersecurity, and acquisition communities
 Providing focused oversight and integration with the LE/CI and intelligence communities through liaison officers and embeds with:
 Air Force Life Cycle Management Center (AFLCMC)
 Army Military Intelligence
 U.S. Cyber Command
 Defense Counterintelligence and Security Agency (DCSA)
 FBI
 National Cyber Investigative Task Force (NCIJTF)

Vulnerability Disclosure 

The mission of the DoD VDP is to function as the single focal point for receiving vulnerability reports and interacting with crowd-sourced cybersecurity researchers supporting the DoDIN.1 This improves network defenses and enhances mission assurance by embracing a previously overlooked, yet indispensable, resource: private-sector white hat researchers. In January 2021, the DoD VDP scope was officially expanded from public-facing websites to all publicly accessible information systems throughout the DoD. This broadens the protection for the DoD attack surface and offers a safe harbor for researchers while providing more asset and technology security. The success of the program relies solely on the expertise and support of the security researcher community, and the program's success contributes to the overall security of the DoD.

See also
Department of the Air Force
Inspector General of the Department of the Air Force
List of United States Air Force Field Operating Agencies

Military Criminal Investigative Organizations
Air Force Office of Special Investigations (AFOSI)
United States Army Criminal Investigation Command (USACIDC or CID)
United States Army Counterintelligence (USAI or CI)
Naval Criminal Investigative Service (NCIS)
Defense Criminal Investigative Service (DCIS)
Coast Guard Investigative Service (CGIS)

Federal law enforcement
Federal Law Enforcement Training Centers
Criminal Investigation Task Force (CITF)
Internet Crimes Against Children (ICAC) Task Force

References

External links
 DC3 Official webpage 
 USAF IG Official webpage

Information Systems Agency
United States Air Force Office of Special Investigations
Naval Criminal Investigative Service
Cybercrime
Computer security organizations
Universities and colleges accredited by the Council on Occupational Education